Ethan O'Connor (born March 5, 1991) is a professional lacrosse player for the Buffalo Bandits of the National Lacrosse League and the Six Nations Chiefs of Major Series Lacrosse. Born in Milton, Ontario, O'Connor began his minor lacrosse career playing for the Milton Mavericks. He was drafted in the Ontario Junior A Lacrosse Draft to the Burlington Chiefs where was named a two time team captain and earned First Team All League honors for his final season. During his junior career, O'Connor also played for the Oakville Buzz and Halton Hills Bulldogs of the OLA Junior B Lacrosse League. O'Connor was drafted in the first round of the 2013 NLL Entry Draft by the Toronto Rock, playing in all but one game his rookie season. After one season with the Rock, he was traded to the Minnesota Swarm (now Georgia Swarm) where he was a contributing member of their 2017 NLL Championship winning team. Prior to the 2018-19 season, O'Connor was traded to his current team, the Bandits. O'Connor also played division one lacrosse for Hobart College.

References 
http://pointstreak.com/prostats/playerpage.html?playerid=8285904&seasonid=15914

1991 births
Canadian lacrosse players
Living people